Cumilla Medical College is a Bangladesh Government Medical College and Hospital conducting MBBS and postgraduate courses in 6 disciplines under University of Chittagong(CU), Chittagong Medical University(CMU) and Bangabandhu Sheikh Mujib Medical University (BSMMU).

History 
Cumilla Medical College is situated at Kuchaitoli, Cumilla, Bangladesh, 5 kilometer south east from Cumilla town and 100 kilometer south east from capital city Dhaka. It was established on 28 November 1979 by Former President Lieutenant-General Ziaur Rahman. The first MBBS batch was recruited in 1981 (Session 1981–82). After a government decision in 1982, the academic program of CuMC (Cumilla Medical College) was called off due to hospital expansion. The medical college reopened on 11 January 1992.

Admission 
H.S.C / A level or equivalent examination passed candidates are selected centrally through a competitive admission test every year conducted by Directorate General of Health Services. Students from foreign countries are also selected for admission in this college from session 2005–2006. Medium of teaching is English. Total 31 batches of students are admitted of which 26 batches already completed their graduation as MBBS.

Infrastructure 

Land area of the college campus is 11 Acres. College building area is about 1,86,000 Sq. ft. and Hospital building area is about 2,70,000 Sq. ft. Total 35 departments are running in the college and Hospital. One Institute of Nuclear Medicine and Allied Sciences, One Morgue, Staff Quarters, Mosque, Shaheed Minar and a Playground are there in the campus.

Administration

General 
Cumilla Medical College is a Government Medical College which administered by the Ministry of Health and Family Welfare. Principal is the Executive head of the college. He communicates and implements all the regulations of the administrative authorities.

Academic Council 
Academic Council is the highest body of the college. Principal, Cumilla Medical College is the chairman and Director, Cumilla Medical College Hospital is Ex-Officio-Member of the Academic Council. The Head of Departments of Anatomy, Physiology, Biochemistry, Pathology, Microbiology, Pharmacology, Community Medicine, Forensic Medicine, Medicine, Surgery, Gynecology & Obstetrics and all other full Professors, two senior-most Associate Professors, two senior-most Assistant Professors and two nominated representatives of students union are the members of the council.

This body monitors and maintains control of the campus in order to ensure a smooth progress of the academic activities. It also refers the disciplinary matters to the Disciplinary Committee to take actions against those who violate any rule or regulation of the college.

There are one principal, one vice-principal, 22 professors, 33 associated professors, 41 assistant professors, 2 curators and 37 lecturers are the members of the institution

Journals 
Journal of Cumilla Medical College Teachers Association is the Official Journal of Cumilla Medical College, recognized by Bangladesh Medical and Dental Council.

See also 
 List of medical colleges in Bangladesh
List of dental schools in Bangladesh
 List of Educational Institutions in Comilla

References

External links
 
 

Medical colleges in Bangladesh
Hospitals in Bangladesh
Educational institutions established in 1992
1992 establishments in Bangladesh
Colleges in Comilla District
Education in Cumilla